107 Piccadilly is a Grade-II listed building on Lena Street in Manchester, England. Situated near Piccadilly Gardens, it was originally built as a packing warehouse and showroom with offices for cotton manufacturer Sparrow Hardwick & Company.

It was designed by influential Mancunian architect Charles Heathcote in a lively Jacobean-Baroque style. The building was completed in 1899. The exterior consists of red sandstone and red brick. The five-storey has an eye-catching central gable on the front façade reminiscent of Jacobean architecture. The use of arched and square windows give the building a playful appearance. The building gained Grade-II listing in 1974. It has since been converted to an Abode Hotel and restaurant.

See also

Listed buildings in Manchester-M1

References

Grade II listed buildings in Manchester
Baroque Revival architecture
Industrial buildings completed in 1899
Grade II listed industrial buildings
1899 establishments in England